Elizabeth Heyrick (née Coltman; 4 December 1769 – 18 October 1831) was an English philanthropist and campaigner against the slave trade. She supported immediate, rather than gradual, abolition.

Early life
Born in Leicester, Elizabeth was the daughter of John Coltman, a manufacturer of worsted cloth and a Unitarian. Her mother, Elizabeth Cartwright, was a poet and writer. As a young woman, Elizabeth was exposed to radical politics and the writings of Thomas Paine, and showed a natural ability for landscape painting. She met John Wesley when he visited the family and soon began to practise Methodism. She became a schoolteacher.

In 1787 she married John Heyrick, a lawyer descendant of Robert Herrick the poet. After her husband's death in 1795, when she was only 25, she became a Quaker and soon after took to social reform, becoming one of the most prominent radical women activists of the 1820s.

Emancipation
In the early 19th century, the prominent leaders of the British abolitionist movement, William Wilberforce and Thomas Clarkson, believed that when the slave trade was abolished in 1807, slavery itself would gradually die out. However, this proved to be not the case as without legislation, planters refused to relinquish their enslaved property. Campaigners such as Heyrick wanted complete and immediate abolition of slavery as an institution. A decade after the abolition of the trade, it became clear to the movement that slavery itself would not die out gradually. As a strong supporter of complete emancipation, she decided to address the leaders of the abolitionist movement. In 1823 or 1824, Heyrick published a pamphlet entitled "Immediate, not Gradual Abolition", criticising leading anti-slavery campaigners such as Wilberforce for their assumptions that the institution of slavery would gradually die out and for focusing too much on the slave trade: "The West Indian planters have occupied much too prominent a place in the discussion of this great question. The abolitionists have shown a great deal too much politeness and accommodation towards these gentlemen." However, "this pamphlet changed their view", and "they now attacked slavery as a sin to be forsaken immediately."

Aiming to promote public awareness of the issues of the slave trade and hit the profits of planters and of importers of slave-produced goods, Heyrick encouraged a social movement to boycott sugar from the West Indies, visiting grocers' shops in Leicester to persuade them not to stock it. Heyrick believed that women should be involved in these issues as they were qualified "not only to sympathise with suffering, but also to plead for the oppressed."

In 1823, Heyrick joined the new Anti-Slavery Society, the Society for the Mitigation and Gradual Abolition of Slavery Throughout the British Dominions. Other founder members included Mary Lloyd, Jane Smeal, Elizabeth Pease, Joseph Sturge, Thomas Clarkson, William Wilberforce, Henry Brougham, Thomas Fowell Buxton and Anne Knight.

Heyrick was a founding member of the Birmingham Ladies Society for the Relief of Negro Slaves in 1825, the first ladies' anti-slavery society in the world.

Other causes
Elizabeth Heyrick was concerned with the welfare of long-term prisoners and worked as a prison visitor. In 1809 she prevented a bull-baiting contest by purchasing the bull. She was the author of more than 20 pamphlets and other writings on those subjects and others such as war, the plight of the poor, vagrancy, wages, corporal punishment and electoral reform. Towards the end of her life she became involved in the campaign against capital punishment. It was said that she fell in love with a slave.

Death
Elizabeth Heyrick did not live to see the Slavery Abolition Act 1833 put one of her major social ambitions into practice. She died on 18 October 1831 and was buried in Leicester.

List of works
A Christmas Box for the Advocates of Bull-Baiting. London: Darton and Harvey, 1809
Bull-Baiting: A Village Dialogue Between Tom Brown and John Simms. London:  Darton and Harvey, 1809
Exposition of one Principle Cause of the National Distress, particularly in Manufacturing Districts, with some Suggestions for its Removal. London: Darton, Harvey and Darton, 1817
Enquiry Into the Consequences of the Present Depreciated Value of Human Labour, In Letters to Thomas Fowell Buxton Esq., Author of An Enquiry Into Our Present System of Prison Discipline. London: Longman, Hurst, Rees, Orme and Brown, 1819
Cursory Remarks on the Evil Tendency of Unrestrained Cruelty; Particularly on That Practised in Smithfield Market. London:  Harvey and Darton, 1823
Protest Against the Spirit and Practice of Modern Legislation, as Exhibited in the New Vagrant Act. London: Harvey and Darton, 1824
Immediate, Not Gradual, Abolition; or, an enquiry into the shortest, safest and most effective means of getting rid of West Indian Slavery. Leicester:  T. Combe, 1824
The Humming Bird; or, Morsels of Information, on the Subject of Slavery. Leicester: A. Cockshaw, 1824–1825.
Apology for Ladies Anti-Slavery Associations. London: J. Hatchard and Son, 1828
An Appeal to the Hearts and Conscience of British Women. Leicester: A. Cockshaw, 1828

See also
Abolitionism in the United Kingdom
Slave Trade Act, 1807
Slavery Abolition Act 1833
History of Slavery
William Lloyd Garrison, who advocated immediate, not gradual, abolition

References

1769 births
1831 deaths
Converts to Quakerism
English abolitionists
English philanthropists
People from Leicester
English Methodists
English Quakers
Methodist abolitionists
Quaker abolitionists